Região Norte or Norte Region may refer to:
 Norte Region, Brazil
 Norte Region, Portugal